Kolagani Rohit Rayudu (born 29 July 1994) is an Indian cricketer. He made his first-class debut for Hyderabad in the 2017–18 Ranji Trophy on 1 November 2017. He made his List A debut for Hyderabad in the 2017–18 Vijay Hazare Trophy on 5 February 2018.

He was the leading run-scorer for Hyderabad in the 2018–19 Vijay Hazare Trophy, with 398 runs in eight matches. In October 2018, he was named in India B's squad for the 2018–19 Deodhar Trophy. He made his Twenty20 debut for Hyderabad in the 2018–19 Syed Mushtaq Ali Trophy on 21 February 2019.

References

External links
 

1994 births
Living people
Indian cricketers
Place of birth missing (living people)
Hyderabad cricketers